Novy Kyakhulay is an urban locality (an urban-type settlement) under the administrative jurisdiction of Leninsky City District of the City of Makhachkala in the Republic of Dagestan, Russia. As of the 2010 Census, its population was 9,875.

History
Urban-type settlement status was granted to Novy Kyakhulay in 1994.

Administrative and municipal status
Within the framework of administrative divisions, the urban-type settlement of Novy Kyakhulay is in jurisdiction of Leninsky City District of the City of Makhachkala. Within the framework of municipal divisions, Novy Kyakhulay is a part of Makhachkala Urban Okrug.

References

Notes

Sources

Urban-type settlements in the Republic of Dagestan